This is a list of Bangladeshi films that was released in 2010.

Releases

See also 

List of Bangladeshi films of 2011
List of Bangladeshi films
Cinema of Bangladesh

References 

Film
Lists of 2010 films by country or language
 2010